List of German basketball champions:

The German club Bayer Giants Leverkusen (formerly known as TSV Bayer 04 Leverkusen and TuS 04 Leverkusen) currently holds the record for the most German basketball men's championships won, having won 14 championships.

West German / German champions (men)

German championship (1938–1966)
 1938–39 LSV Spandau (1)
 1939-46 Not held due to World War II
 1946–47 MTSV Schwabing (1)
 1947–48 Turnerbund Heidelberg (1)
 1948–49 MTSV Schwabing (2)
 1949–50 Stuttgart-Degerloch (1)
 1950–51 Turnerbund Heidelberg (2)
 1951–52 Turnerbund Heidelberg (3)
 1952–53 Turnerbund Heidelberg (4)
 1953–54 Bayern Munich (1)
 1954–55 Bayern Munich (2)
 1955–56 ATV Düsseldorf (1)
 1956–57 USC Heidelberg (1)
 1957–58 USC Heidelberg (2)
 1958–59 USC Heidelberg (3)
 1959–60 USC Heidelberg (4)
 1960–61 USC Heidelberg (5)
 1961–62 USC Heidelberg (6)
 1962–63 Alemannia Aachen (1)
 1963–64 Alemannia Aachen (2)
 1964–65 Gießen 46ers (1)
 1965–66 USC Heidelberg (7)

Basketball Bundesliga (1966–present)

East German champions (men)

1990: BSG AdW Berlin
1989: HSG TU Magdeburg
1988: HSG TU Magdeburg
1987: BSG AdW Berlin
1986: BSG AdW Berlin
1985: BSG AdW Berlin
1984: BSG AdW Berlin
1983: BSG AdW Berlin
1982: BSG AdW Berlin
1981: BSG AdW Berlin
1980: BSG AdW Berlin
1979: BSG AdW Berlin
1978: BSG AdW Berlin
1977: HSG K-M-U Leipzig
1976: HSG K-M-U Leipzig
1975: HSG K-M-U Leipzig
1974: BSG AdW Berlin
1973: HSG K-M-U Leipzig
1972: SK KPV 69 Halle
1971: HSG K-M-U Leipzig
1970: SK KPV 69 Halle
1969: ASK Vorwärts Leipzig
1968: ASK Vorwärts Leipzig
1967: ASK Vorwärts Leipzig
1966: ASK Vorwärts Leipzig
1965: ASK Vorwärts Leipzig
1964: SC Chemie Halle
1963: SC Chemie Halle
1962: ASK Vorwärts Halle
1961: HSG Humboldt-Universität Berlin
1960: HSG Humboldt-Universität Berlin
1959: HSG Humboldt-Universität Berlin
1958: HSG Humboldt-Universität Berlin
1957: HSG Wiss. HU Berlin
1956: HSG Wiss. HU Berlin
1955: HSG Wiss. HU Berlin
1954: HSG Wiss. HU Berlin
1953: HSG Wiss. HU Berlin

German champions (women)

2010: TV Crimerz
2009: TV 1872 Saarlouis Royals
2008: TSV 1880 Wasserburg
2007: TSV 1880 Wasserburg
2006: TSV 1880 Wasserburg
2005: TSV 1880 Wasserburg
2004: TSV 1880 Wasserburg
2003: BC Marburg
2002: BTV Gold-Zack Wuppertal
2001: BTV Gold-Zack Wuppertal
2000: BTV Wuppertal
1999: BTV Wuppertal
1998: BTV Wuppertal
1997: BTV Wuppertal
1996: BTV Wuppertal
1995: BTV Wuppertal
1994: BTV Wuppertal
1993: Barmer TV 1846
1992: Lotus München
1991: DJK Agon 08 Düsseldorf
1990: DJK Agon 08 Düsseldorf
1989: Barmer TV 1846
1988: DJK Agon 08 Düsseldorf
1987: DJK Agon 08 Düsseldorf
1986: DJK Agon 08 Düsseldorf
1985: DJK Agon 08 Düsseldorf
1984: DJK Agon 08 Düsseldorf
1983: DJK Agon 08 Düsseldorf
1982: DJK Agon 08 Düsseldorf
1981: DJK Agon 08 Düsseldorf
1980: DJK Agon 08 Düsseldorf
1979: TuS 04 Leverkusen
1978: TuS 04 Leverkusen
1977: Düsseldorfer BG ART/TVG
1976: Düsseldorfer BG ART/TVG
1975: DJK Agon 08 Düsseldorf
1974: 1. SC 05 Göttingen
1973: Heidelberger SC
1972: 1. SC 05 Göttingen
1971: 1. SC 05 Göttingen
1970: 1. SC 05 Göttingen
1969: VfL Lichtenrade Berlin
1968: 1. SC 05 Göttingen
1967: ATV 1877 Düsseldorf
1966: SV Schwaben Augsburg
1965: ATV 1877 Düsseldorf
1964: TV Augsburg 1847
1963: Heidelberger TV 1846
1962: TV Groß-Gerau
1961: TV Augsburg 1847
1960: Heidelberger TV 1846
1959: Heidelberger TV 1846
1958: Heidelberger TV 1846
1957: Heidelberger TV 1846
1956: Heidelberger TV 1846
1955: Heidelberger TV 1846
1954: TSG Heidelberg 1846
1953: Neuköllner SF Berlin
1952: Turnerbund Heidelberg
1951: TC Jahn 1883 München
1950: TC Jahn 1883 München
1949: TSC Spandau 1880
1948: TC Jahn 1883 München
1947: TC Jahn 1883 München

See also
German Basketball League
German Basketball League Awards
German Basketball Cup
German Basketball Supercup
German League All-Star Game

Notes

References

External links
German League official website

Champions